Margareta of Toszek (1467/68 – 8 November 1531), was a Polish princess and abbess.

Life
She was the only child of Duke Przemysław of Toszek and Margareta, daughter of Duke Nicholas I of Opole, and thereby a member of the House of Piast in the Oświęcim branch. Around 1481 or 1482 Margareta became a nun in the monastery of St. Klara in Wrocław. In February 1508 she was elected Abbess. Margareta held this post until 3 February 1515; however, six months later, on 27 August 1515, she was elected again as Abbess, this time until her death. She was buried in the Piast Mausoleum of St. Klara in Wrocław.

References
 Jasiński K., Rodowód Piastów śląskich, Vol. 3, Wrocław 1977, p. 190.
1460s births
1531 deaths
Piast dynasty
Roman Catholic abbesses
15th-century Polish nuns
16th-century Polish Roman Catholic nuns